Oksana Hatamkhanova (Azeri: Oksana Hətəmxanova; born 29 June 1990 in Novyi Buh, Soviet Union) is a Ukrainian-born Azerbaijani Olympic swimmer. She swam for Azerbaijan in the 2008 and 2012 Olympics, both times qualifying by wild card.

In Beijing, she finished 46th in the 100m breaststroke, failing to advance on to the semifinals.

In London, she came in 4th in her heat in the 100m breaststroke and finished 44th and thus failed to qualify for the semifinals.

She also swam at the 2007 World Championships.

References

External links
 

1990 births
Living people
Sportspeople from Mykolaiv Oblast
Ukrainian female swimmers
Azerbaijani female swimmers
Swimmers at the 2008 Summer Olympics
Swimmers at the 2012 Summer Olympics
Olympic swimmers of Azerbaijan
Ukrainian emigrants to Azerbaijan
Naturalized citizens of Azerbaijan
Azerbaijani people of Ukrainian descent